World Pulse is a “Social-Media-for-Social-Revolution” initiative, founded and run by Jensine Larsen, in 2003, based out of Portland, Oregon. World Pulse is a social network for women.

History 
World Pulse was founded by Jensine Larsen.  In 2003, World Pulse was created as a non-profit media organization, to create a magazine that would address pressing global issues through the voices of women. In 2004, the magazine made its debut. In 2007, World Pulse started a web site to complement the print magazine. The last print issue was released in 2011. Currently, World Pulse is an online-only media initiative.

Activities 
 Social media: The online community on World Pulse is a web-based platform that is open for use by women anywhere in the world. These stories have also been published on Huffington Post and The TIME Magazine.

References 

2003 establishments in Oregon
Social networks for social change